Bhanjal is an advance village in Una District of Himachal Pradesh, India.

According to Census 2011 information the location code or village code of Bhanjal village is 018148. Bhanjal village is located in Amb Tehsil of Una district in Himachal Pradesh, India. It is situated 37 km away from district headquarter Una. Amb is the sub-district headquarter of Bhanjal village. As per 2009 stats, Bhanjal Upper is the gram panchayat of Bhanjal village.

The total geographical area of village is 183.68 hectares. Bhanjal has a total population of 1,486 peoples. There are about 324 houses in Bhanjal village. Gagret is nearest town to Bhanjal.

The latitude 31.11 and longitude 77.16 are the geocoordinate of the Bhanjal Upper.

Places to visit near Bhanjal 
 Mata Chintpurni  {20 km approx}
 Dera Amlehar       {2 - 3 km approx}
 Mata Bhadarkali   {10 - 12 km approx}
 Bombay Picnic Spot (7 - 8 km approx)

Temperature 
The temperature of Bhanjal Varies from 47 °C in summer to 0 °C in winter.

How to reach Bhanjal

By Rail 

Amb Andaura Rail Way Station are the very nearby railway station to Bhanjal. How ever	Jalandhar City Rail Way Station is major railway station 70 km near to Bhanjal .

Bus Stops in Bhanjal, Gagret 
Bhanjal Bus Stop

Daulatpur - Mubarikpur road {Link Road To Sunkali Bhadarkali}

Amb bus stop 
Amb UNA Rd; Himachal Pradesh 177210; India 
7 km distance Detail

Mubarkpur bus stop 
Una; Himachal Pradesh 177203; India 
3.3 km distance Detail
    Hotels and lodges in Bhanjal, Gagret

Bombay Picnic Spot Hotel & Resort 
Chintpurni Road; Amb; Himachal Pradesh 177202; India 
2.5 km distance      Detail

Siddharth Resorts 
Chandigarh-Chintapurni-Dharamshala Rd; Himachal Pradesh 177210; India 
3.1 km distance      Detail

Midway Hotel 
NH20A; Himachal Pradesh 177210; India 
3.5 km distance      Detail

Hotel Savera 
NH70; Ambota; Punjab 177205; India 
4.8 km distance      Detail

Connectivity of Bhanjal 

Type

Status

Public Bus Service

Available within village

Private Bus Service

Available within village

Railway Station

Available within 10+ km distance

Bhanjal 
Block / Tehsil → Ghanari

District → Una

State → Himachal Pradesh

References

Villages in Una district